Claughton is a small village and civil parish in the City of Lancaster in Lancashire, England.  The village is on the A683 road east of Lancaster and at the time of the 2001 census had a population of 132. In the 2011 census Claughton was grouped with Roeburndale (2001 pop. 76) to give a total of 223.

North of the village is the River Lune, and to the south is Claughton Moor and the fells of the Forest of Bowland.

Local government
Claughton is part of the Lower Lune Valley ward, which elects two councillors to Lancaster City Council every four years.

Industry

There is a brickworks, Claughton Brickworks, in the village. Ropeway conveyors, which transport clay from Claughton Moor to the Claughton Brickworks, are suspended above the road (A683).

Religious sites
St Chad's Church was closed by the Church of England in 2002 due to a decline in the number of worshippers and the fact that the building was in need of modernisation.  The church was part of the Hornby with Claughton parish.  There was a church on the site as early as 1100.

Railway
Trains running between Lancaster Green Ayre railway station and Wennington railway station stopped at Claughton between Caton and Hornby. In 1853, for example, the 11am from Morecambe to Skipton called at Claughton at 11.35.

See also

Listed buildings in Claughton, Lancaster

References

External links

Geography of the City of Lancaster
Villages in Lancashire
Civil parishes in Lancashire
Forest of Bowland